Xhuljo Mehmeti (born 29 December 1993) is an Albanian footballer who plays for Kastrioti Krujë in the Albanian First Division.

Career
Ahead of the 2019/20 season, Mehmeti joined newly relegated Albanian First Division club KS Kastrioti.

References

1993 births
Living people
People from Kamëz
Footballers from Tirana
Albanian footballers
Association football midfielders
FC Kamza players
KS Kastrioti players
Kategoria e Parë players
Kategoria Superiore players